George W. Braxdell was a barber and judge who served in the Alabama state legislature during the Reconstruction era. He was a justice of the peace in Talladega, Alabama. He served in the Alabama House of Representatives in 1870.

See also
List of African-American officeholders during the Reconstruction era

References

19th-century American politicians
African-American politicians during the Reconstruction Era
Members of the Alabama House of Representatives
People from Talladega, Alabama
Year of birth missing
Year of death missing